Kimberly Jessica Newell (born October 4, 1995), also known by the Chinese name Zhou Jiaying, is a Canadian ice hockey player and member of the Chinese national ice hockey team. She most recently played in the 2021–22 season of the Zhenskaya Hockey League (ZhHL) with the KRS Vanke Rays.

Newell represented China in the women's ice hockey tournament at the 2022 Winter Olympics in Beijing.

Early life and education 
Newell was born on October 4, 1995, in Vancouver, Canada. Newell's mother emigrated from China to Vancouver to obtain a Ph.D. in electrical engineering at the University of British Columbia. There she met her future husband, who was doing a master's in electrical engineering. Newell holds a bachelor's degree in economics and finance from Princeton University. At Princeton, Newell spent three years taking Mandarin Chinese courses to be able to communicate with her grandfather on her mother's side. Newell's paternal grandmother played field hockey in her native Germany.

International career 

As a junior player with the Canadian national under-18 team, Newell won a gold medal at the IIHF Women's U18 World Championships in 2013, where she represented Canada alongside future Chinese national team teammate Hannah Miller on a roster that also included future Canadian senior national team players Emily Clark, Sarah Nurse, and Sarah Potomak, among others. In net for three of Canada’s five games, Newell maintained an excellent 1.00 goals against average and recorded the tournament’s best save percentage at .960, earning selection to the tournament All-Star team.

Newell was officially named to the Chinese women's national team roster for the women's ice hockey tournament at the 2022 Winter Olympics on 28 January 2022. She was one of several players on the team with Canadian or American citizenship. During a post-match Olympics press briefing, Newell was not allowed to speak English to international reporters despite it being her native language. Instead, she used a translator.

Newell had the best save percentage at the 2022 Winter Olympics (95.5%).

Personal life
Following her 2016 graduation, Newell worked in finance for Credit Suisse in New York City for two years until being recruited to play for the KRS Vanke Rays in 2018.

References

External links

1995 births
Living people
Canadian expatriate ice hockey players in China
Canadian expatriate ice hockey players in Russia
Canadian expatriate ice hockey players in the United States
Canadian people of German descent
Canadian sportspeople of Chinese descent
Canadian women's ice hockey goaltenders
Ice hockey people from British Columbia
Ice hockey players at the 2022 Winter Olympics
Olympic ice hockey players of China
People from Nelson, British Columbia
Princeton Tigers women's ice hockey players
Shenzhen KRS Vanke Rays players